The 2015–16 Central Arkansas Sugar Bears basketball team represented the University of Central Arkansas during the 2015–16 NCAA Division I women's basketball season. The Sugar Bears, led by fourth year head coach Sandra Rushing and played their home games at the Farris Center. They were members of the Southland Conference. They finished the season 28–4, 16–2 in Southland play to finish in second place. They won the Southland women's tournament to earn an automatic trip to the NCAA women's tournament for the first time school history. They lost to Louisville in the first round.

Roster

Schedule

|-
!colspan=9 style="background:#4F2D7F; color:#818A8F;"| Non-conference regular Schedule

|-
!colspan=9 style="background:#4F2D7F; color:#818A8F;"| Southland Conference Schedule

|-
!colspan=9 style="background:#4F2D7F; color:#818A8F;"| Southland Women's Tournament

|-
!colspan=9 style="background:#4F2D7F; color:#818A8F;"| NCAA Women's Tournament

See also
2015–16 Central Arkansas Bears basketball team

References

Central Arkansas Sugar Bears basketball seasons
Central Arkansas
Central Arkansas Bears basketball team
Central Arkansas Bears basketball team
Central Arkansas